Pierre Ango (1640 in Rouen – 18 October 1694 in La Flèche) was a French Catholic priest and scientist.

He was a professor at the College of La Flèche. In 1682, he published parts of Pardies' work on optics in his book Optique. In this work, Ango provided a construction for refraction which was not dissimilar that of Hooke.

Works 
 1682 - L'Optique divisée en trois livres (Optics divided in three books)

Notes

1640 births
1694 deaths
17th-century French Jesuits
17th-century French physicists
Catholic clergy scientists
Jesuit scientists